The 2018 Play In Challenger was a professional tennis tournament played on indoor hard courts. It was the first edition of the tournament which was part of the 2018 ATP Challenger Tour. It took place in Lille, France, between 19 and 25 March 2018.

Singles main-draw entrants

Seeds

 1 Rankings are as of 5 March 2018.

Other entrants
The following players received wildcards into the singles main draw:
  Hugo Grenier
  Ugo Humbert
  Maxime Janvier
  Yannick Mertens

The following players received entry from the qualifying draw:
  Grégoire Barrère
  Antoine Escoffier
  David Guez
  Guillermo Olaso

The following player received entry as a lucky loser:
  Laurynas Grigelis

Champions

Singles

 Grégoire Barrère def.  Tobias Kamke 6–1, 6–4.

Doubles

 Hugo Nys /  Tim Pütz def.  Jeevan Nedunchezhiyan /  Purav Raja 7–6(7–3), 1–6, [10–7].

External links
Official Website

2018 ATP Challenger Tour
2018 in French tennis